Mark Lasoff is a visual effects artist.

He won at the 70th Academy Awards for the film Titanic, he shared his win with Thomas L. Fisher, Michael Kanfer, and Robert Legato. This was in the category of Best Visual Effects.

Selected filmography

Total Recall (1990)
In the Line of Fire (1993)
Apollo 13 (1995)
Titanic (1997)
The Scorpion King (2002)

References

External links

Living people
Best Visual Effects Academy Award winners
Special effects people
Year of birth missing (living people)